Spiral Health is a Community Interest Company based in Blackpool formed in 2012 by nurses from Blackpool Teaching Hospitals NHS Foundation Trust.

It runs two care homes in Bispham, Blackpool, where there are 28 beds,  and Preston, where there are 64 beds, which are also used for rehabilitation and a physiotherapy at home programme.  It has been praised for its high levels of staff engagement.  There are 121 staff.

It is said to create £17.5m worth of financial value each year.  It provided 17,628 rehabilitation bed nights in 2014/5 for 1,171 patients, and is said to have saved more than £7 million in the cost of A&E attendances.

It won the title of Lancashire’s Social Enterprise of the Year in November 2014.

It took over the  Little Sisters of the Poor nursing home in Preston in 2017.

References

Health in Lancashire
Community interest companies
Nursing organisations in the United Kingdom